The Maupin Woodstock One is an American high-wing, single-seat glider designed by Jim Maupin and made available as plans for amateur construction.

Design and development
The Woodstock was designed in the late 1970s by Maupin, with assistance from Irv Culver, who designed the airfoil for the wing. Culver's airfoil is of 18% thickness at the root, thinning to 13% thickness at the wing tip and incorporates no washout.

The aircraft's design goals were low cost and simplicity of construction. Four design principles were employed: using the least expensive materials, using as little material as possible, keeping the design simple and utilizing as many common parts as possible. The resulting airframe is all-wood, with the major structural parts fabricated from Douglas fir. The tail and wing covering are birch. The wing and tailplane ribs are made in pairs from marine-grade fir plywood using a bandsaw. The wing spar is a hollow box for the first  from the root and then changes to a "C-section" outboard. Top surface spoilers are provided.

The main landing gear is an  go-cart wheel mounted as a fixed monowheel, with a brake fashioned from aluminium sheet and employed as a band brake, actuated by a bicycle brake lever mounted on the control stick.

Operational history
The Woodstock won first place in the 1984 Sailplane Homebuilders Association design contest.

In 1998 Gary Osoba won the US Region 9 Sports Class contest in his Woodstock. In April 1998, Osoba earned US National and World Records in the Ultralight Category for Straight Distance, Distance to a Goal, and Distance up to Three Turnpoints for a flight of 340 miles in his Woodstock.

Variants
Woodstock One
Original prototype with  wingspan.
Woodstock (12.5m)
Version with  wingspan.
Woodstock (13m)
Version with  wingspan.

Specifications (prototype)

See also

References

1970s United States sailplanes
Aircraft first flown in 1978